Top Gun: Fire at Will is a video game developed and published by Spectrum HoloByte for DOS, Windows, PlayStation, and Mac OS. It is a licensed game in the Top Gun franchise. A sequel, Top Gun: Hornet's Nest, was released in 1998.

Gameplay
The game's overall plot focuses on the player-character, Maverick, going to combat in Cuba, North Korea, and Libya against a secret group of mercenary pilots called the "Cadre".

The PlayStation version differs greatly from the PC versions, emphasizing action over simulation; in particular, take-offs and landings were cut, and the player begins each mission with enemies near at hand, rather than having to hunt them down.

Development
Top Gun: Fire At Will was released by Spectrum HoloByte in 1996 for DOS, Windows, and PlayStation. Mac OS port was released in 1998. It is the only title to feature any actors from the film, with James Tolkan reprising his role as a commanding officer (he is called "Stinger" in the film, but is called "Hondo" in Fire at Will).

Reception

The MS-DOS version received average reviews. A Next Generation critic called Top Gun: Fire at Will a flight sim without being simulation, having no video clips and lame plot. While he complimented the variety of missions, the networked multiplayer, and aspects of the graphics, he held to his overall negative assessment of the game. Robin G. Kim of Computer Gaming World praised the game for "action-filled missions with great atmosphere and an intriguing storyline", but conceded the game suffered from "blotchy terrain graphics", poor sound design and technical issues.

A reviewer for PC PowerPlay admitted "Top Gun is not a flight sim, nor does it claim to be", but that the simplicity of the gameplay will appeal to the person who wants to play a jet style shoot-em-up with a bit of a story line to keep them interested.

The PlayStation version also received middling reviews. Critics noted that the game is more of an action-heavy, arcade-style shoot 'em up than a realistic flight simulator, but were divided over whether this unexpected choice of gameplay style was reasonably successful. Some praised the mixture of arcade-style and simulation style gameplay, while others criticized the lack of takeoff and landing sequences and the way the controls differ from most flight sims. However, critics generally agreed that the graphics are very good, and that the enemy pilots are boringly easy to defeat.

The game sold more than 375,000 copies.

References

External links

1996 video games
Classic Mac OS games
Combat flight simulators
DOS games
MicroProse games
PlayStation (console) games
Spectrum HoloByte games
Top Gun video games
Video games based on films
Video games developed in the United States